Talip Küçükcan (born 5 March 1963) is a Turkish professor of sociology and a former politician from the Justice and Development Party (AKP), who has served as a Member of Parliament for Adana since 7 June 2015 until 24 June 2018. He was head of the Turkish Delegation to and the Deputy President of the Parliamentary Assembly of the Council of Europe and member of Foreign Relations Committee at the Turkish Parliament between 2015 and 2017. Küçükcan served as the deputy chairman of Political and Legal Affairs of the Justice and Development Party until July 2016. He also served as member of the OSCE PA of the Turkish delegation.

Born in Osmaniye, Küçükcan graduated from Uludağ University Faculty of Theoloy in 1986, received an MA from the School of Oriental and African Studies, University of London, and a PhD in ethnic relations from the University of Warwick. He worked as a research fellow at the Centre for Research in Ethnic Relations at the University of Warwick between 1997 and 1999. Before moving to Marmara University Faculty of Theology, he was a senior research fellow at the Center for Islamic Studies in Istanbul until 2007. He served as a senior advisor to the President of Higher Education Council of Turkey between 2009 and 2013. He served as director of Institute for Middle East Studies at Marmara University between 2011-2014. He worked for SETA, foundation for political, economic and social research. He served as the editor in chief of Insight Turkey, a policy journal until 2015. He is appointed as the Personal Representative of the OSCE Chairperson-in-Office on Combating Intolerance and Discrimination against Muslims for 2014 and 2015. He was the President of the Union of Academicians and Writers of the Muslim World between 2018-2021, (AY-BİR) a civil society association based in Istanbul. Küçükcan works on Middle Eastern affairs, Turkey-EU relations, comparative secularism, freedom of religion, migration, state-religion relations and Muslim minorities in Europe. He is a regular commentator on national and international media. He was a regular contributor to TV debate programs Enine Boyuna and Açı on TRT for many years. He speaks fluent English.

Publications
Books
 Global Disruptions and the Making of a New Middle East, (edited by Talip Kucukcan), İstanbul: TRT World Research Centre, 2022, ISBN 9786059984386, 253 pages. https://researchcentre.trtworld.com/wp-content/uploads/2022/06/Global_Disruptions.pdf
Türkiye'de Arap İmajı: Toplumsal Hafıza, Popüler Kültür, Kamuoyu (Arab İmage in Turkey: Social Memory, Popular Culture, Public Opinion), (Edited by Talip Küçükcan), İstanbul: Çamlıca Yayınları, 2022, ISBN 9786258427158, 216 pages.
 Küresel Güçlerin Müdahaleciliği: Darbeler ve Demokrasi, (Editör), İstanbul: Üsküdar Belediyesi Yayınları, June 2022, ISBN 9786059719810, 167 pages.
 Politics of Ethnicity, Identity and Religion: Turkish-Muslims in Britain, Avebury: Ashgate, December, 1999
 Diaspora Türkleri (Turkish Diaspora), İstanbul, 2021.
 Dogal Afetler ve Din: Marmara Depremi Uzerine Psiko-Sosyolojik Bir Arastirma (Natural Disasters and Religion) (co-authored with Ali Kose), ISAM, Istanbul, 2000
 EuroTurks and Turkey-EU Relations: The Dutch Case, (co-authored with V. Gungor), Turkevi Research Centre, Amsterdam, 2006
 AB Ulkelerinde Din-Devlet Iliskileri, (State-Religion Relations in EU Countries), (co-edited with Ali Kose) Istanbul: Center for Islamic Research
 Turks in Europe: Culture, Identity and Integration, (Co-edited with V. Gungor), Amsterdam: Turkevi Research Centre, Amsterdam, 2009.
 Türkiye’de Yüksek Öğretim: Karşılaştırmalı Bir Analiz (Higher Education in Turkey: A Comparative Analysis) (with Bekir S. Gur), Ankara: Seta Foundation, 2009
 Yükseköğretimde Kalite Güvencesi (Quality Assurance in Higher Education) (with Mahmut Ozer and Bekir S. Gur), Ankara: Seta Foundation, 2010

Articles
 "Türkiye’s Migration Experience and Policy Orientations: Integrating Syrians in Higher Education". Studia Europejskie – Studies in European Affairs, 3/2022, pp. 175-193. DOI: 10.33067/SE.3.2022.8 https://journalse.com/pliki/pw/3-2022-Kucukcan.pdf
 "Towards a New Middle East amidst Global Disruptions and Regional Transitions: An Introduction", in Global Disruptions and the Making of a New Middle East, (edited by Talip Kucukcan), İstanbul: TRT World Research Centre, 2022, pp. 2-10.
 "Türk Toplumunun Öteki Algısı ve Kamuoyunda Arap İmajı", in Türkiye'de Arap İmajı: Toplumsal Hafıza, Popüler Kültür, Kamuoyu, (Edited by Talip Küçükcan), İstanbul: Çamlıca Yayınları, 2022, ISBN 9786258427158, pp. 83-215.
 "İslam Dünyasının İslamofobi ile Mücadelesinin Parametreleri". TRT Akademi , 7 (15), 2022, pp. 768-779 . DOI: 10.37679/trta.1124113
 "The Belt and Road Initiative and Middle Eastern Politics: Challenges Ahead", Insight Turkey, Vol. 19, No. 3, 2017, pp. 83–91. https://www.insightturkey.com/file/45/the-belt-and-road-initiative-and-middle-eastern-politics-challenges-ahead-insight-turkey-summer-2017
 “European Views of Turkish Foreign Policy”, (with M Kucukkeles), Insight Turkey, Vol. 15, No 1, 2013, pp. 127–144 
 “Are Muslim Democrats a Threat to Consolidating Freedom of Religion? The Turkish Case”, in Allen Hertzke (ed.), The Future of Religious Freedom, Oxford: Oxford University Press, 2012, pp. 270–289
 “Dritto e Religione in Turchia”, in Alesseandro Ferrari (ed.), Diritto e Religione nell’Islam Mediterraneo, Bologna: Societa Editriceil Mulino, 2012, pp. 283–304
 “Derecho Y Religion En Turqia”, Revista General de Derecho Canónico y Derecho Eclesiástico del Estado, Number 28, 2012, pp. 1–16. 
 ″Sacralization of the State and Secular Nationalism: Foundations of Civil Religion in Turkey", The George Washington International Law Review, 2011, Vol. 41, No.4, 2010, pp. 963–983 https://papers.ssrn.com/sol3/papers.cfm?abstract id=2498558
 “State, Religion and Law in Turkey”, in Electing Faith: Intersection of Law and Religion in Politics Around the World, Boston College Law School & Religion Program, 2008, pp. 59–74
 “Turkish Migrants, Social Capital and Culturalist Discourse in Turkey-EU Relations”, in Dietrich Jung and Catharina Raudvere (eds.), Politics, Religion, and Turkey's EU Accession, London: Macmillan Press, 2008, pp. 199–221
 “Islamic Institutions and Social Change in Tatarstan: Rediscovery of Religious Heritage and Muslim Identity”, in Proceedings of the Second International Symposium on Islamic Civilisation in Volga-Ural Region, Istanbul: Istanbul: Research Islamic History, Art and Culture, 2005, pp. 91–99.
 “Bridging the European Union and Turkey: The Turkish Diaspora in Europe”, Insight Turkey, Vol 9, Number 4, pp. 85–99.
 “Bringing Together two Cultures and Identities: Turkish Civil Capital in Europe”, in Proceedings of the International Conference on Migration and Women, Istanbul, 2007, pp. 381–387.
 “Les Politiques, les Discours Politiques et l’Islamophobie”, in L’Intolerance Et La Discrimination Envers Les Musulmans, Strasbourg: Cojep International, 2007, pp. 149–155.
 “Challenges to Political Leadership in Combating Islamophobia”, Muslim Public Affairs Journal, Winter, 2007, pp. 75–80.
 “Image of Turkey and perception of European Identity Among Euro-Turks in Holland”, Euro Agenda, Year: 5, Issue: 9, No: 2/2006, pp. 225–238 (co-author: Veyis Gungor)
 ″Symbolic Religiosity among the Turkish Youth in Britain’, in Manual Fanzman, Christel Gärtner, Nicole Köck (eds.), Religiösität in der säkularisierten Welt, Wiesbaden: Vs Verlag Fürsocialwisswnschaften, 2006, pp. 333–336.
 ‘Multidimensional Approach to Religion: a way of looking at religious phenomena’, Journal for the Study of Religions and Ideologies, Number 10, Spring 2005, pp. 60–70.
‘The Making of Turkish-Muslim Diaspora in Britain: Religious Collective Identity in a Multicultural Public Sphere’, Journal of Muslim Minority Affairs, Volume 24, No. 2, 2004, pp. 243–258.
‘Turkey's Identity Options and the Challenges of Turkey's EU Relations’, Insight Turkey, Volume 6, Number 3, July–September 2004, pp. 120–125.
 ‘Dominant Discourses and Policies of Multicultural European Countries on National Identity and Religion in Public Schools’ in Milan Mesic (ed.), Perspectives of Multiculturalism: Western and Transitional Countries, FF Press & Croatian Commission for UNESCO, Zagreb, pp. 113–123.
 ‘State, Islam and Religious Liberty in Modern Turkey: Reconfiguration of Religion in the Public Sphere’, Brigham Young University Law Review, Volume 2003, No: 2, pp. 475–507. https://papers.ssrn.com/sol3/papers.cfm?abstract id=2498563
 ‘Sites of National Imagery: Imparting the Dominant Culture through Public Education in Europe’, Journal of Economic and Social Research, Volume 4, No: 2, pp. 95–114.
 ‘Modes of Belonging: Articulation of Turkish Youth in Diaspora’ in Ayse Lahur Kirtunc, A. Silku, K. W. Rose and M. Erdem (eds.), Selves at Home, Selves in Exile, Proceedings of the Seventh Cultural Symposium, Ege University American Studies Association, ASAT, Ege University, Publication of The Faulty of Letters, Izmir, pp. 39–48.
 “Turks in Germany: Between Inclusion and Exclusion”, Turkish Journal of Islamic Studies, No. 7, pp. 97–118. https://papers.ssrn.com/sol3/papers.cfm?abstract_id=2498611
 ‘Looking at Religious Education in Secular National Contexts in Western Europe’, Euro Agenda, Vol. 1, Number 2
 ‘Ethnicity, Identity and Strategies of Conflict Resolution in a British School: Turkish Pupils in a Comprehensive Public School’, Education et Société Plurilingues, No: 6, Juin, pp. 55–66
 ‘Re-claiming Identity: Ethnicity, Religion and Politics among Turkish Muslims in Bulgaria and Greece’, Journal of Muslim Minority Affairs, Vol. 19, No: 1, pp. 59–78
 ‘Some Reflections on the Wahhabiya and Sanusiya Movements’, Hamdard Islamicus, Vol. 18,1995, N0.2, pp. 67–82
 ‘An Analytical Comparison of the Aligarh and the Deobandi Schools’, Islamic Quarterly, 1994' Vol. 38, No. 1, pp. 48–58
 ‘Conversion to Islam with Reference to Egypt and Iraq’, Islamic Quarterly, Vol. 35, 1991, No. 4, pp. 225–232
 ‘The Nature of Islamic Resurgence in the Near and Middle Eastern Muslim Societies’, Hamdard Islamicus, 1990, Vol. 14, No. 2, pp. 65–104

Reports
 European Perceptions of Turkish Foreign Policy (with M. Kucukkeles), Istanbul: Seta Foundation, 2012.
 Arab Image in Turkey, Istanbul: Research Report No.1, Ankara: Political, Economic and Social Research Foundation, 2010.
 Public Perception of the Kurdish Question in Turkey, (with a team at Seta) Istanbul: Seta Foundation, 2009.

Conference Papers
 “The Turks in UK”, Paper presented at the International Conference on "Turkish Communities in Europe: Challenges, claims and international issues", Organized by the Department of Anthropology of Religion, Sapienza di Roma University, 23 May 2022, (on-line). (Invited speaker)
 Panel Speaker on "US Foreign Policy in The Middle East in Post-Trump Era. Will a Biden Presidency be any Different?" A webinar panel organized by The Centre for British-Turkish Understanding, 14 January 2021, London, UK  (Invited speaker)
 Panel Speaker on “The Role of Parliaments in the Protection of Missing Migrant Children” at the Web Conference on Protecting Migrant Childiren and Saving Missing Children, organized by the Turkish Parliament and PACE Committee on Migration, Refugees and Displaced Persons, 24 November 2020. (Invited speaker)
 Panel Speaker on “Hagia Sophia- History, Context, Politics and Future Perspectives”, Web Conference organized by Awqaf South Africa, 29 July 2020.  (Invited speaker)
 Panel Speaker on "Forging a Sustainable Future: Empowering Youth and Vulnerable Communities", organized by Trt World Citizen, YTB, United Nations, 11.02.2020, New york, UN (Invited Speaker)
 "Hearing on 'At What Cost?' The Human Toll of Turkey’s Policy at Home and Abroad” (Testified in the U.S. Congress to the Commission on Security and Cooperation in Europe), 31 October 2019, The U.S. Congress, Washington D.C. (Invited speaker)
 “The Threat of Far Right Extremism: War on Terror2.0?", Panel speaker at the 3rd TRT World Forum on "Globalisation in Retreat: Risks and Opportunities", 21–22 October 2019, Istanbul Congress Center, Turkey. (Invited speaker)
 “Internationalization of Turkish Higher Education: Turkey in EU Innovation and Higher Education Area”, paper presented at the Study in Turkey Meeting organized by The Foreign Economic Relations Board of Turkey on the sideline of European Association of Higher Education (EAIE) 2019 International Education Conference, 24–27 September, Helsinki, Finland. (Invited speaker)
 “Conference on Higher Education of Students under International Protection”, (Panel Speaker), Organized by UNHCR, TRT World and YTB, 30 July 2019, Istanbul, Turkey (Invited speaker)
 “Turkey’s policy towards Syrians: Addressing emerging challenges”, paper presented at a panel on The Humanitarian Role of Turkey on the Refugee Crisis and the Road Ahead for Europe, organized by TRT World Research Centre, Palace of Westminster, Houses of Parliament, 19 June 2019, London, United Kingdom. (Invited speaker)
 "Globalization and Representation of ‘others” in an Age of Populism", paper presented at the Russia-Islamic World Kazan Summit, Organized by Tatarstan Investment Agency, 24–16 April 2019, Kazan, Republic of Tatarstan. (Invited speaker)
 “The Securitization of Islam and Muslims after 9/11: Reasons and Consequences”, paper presented at The Second International Islamophobia Conference: Analyzing its Discourse and Geopolitics. The Center for Islam and Global Affairs (CIGA) at Istanbul Zaim University (IZU), April 12–14, 2019, Istanbul. (Invited speaker)
 “Insecurity, Instability and Migration: Major Global Challenges”, paper presented at the Panel on Turkish and Canadian Perspectives on Current Global Challenges, Conference on Turkey-Canada Relations: Perspectives on Current Global Challenges And Archeology as a Discipline to Build Bridges, Friday, March 29, 2019, University of Toronto Koffler House, Toronto, Canada. (Invited speaker)
 "Turkey's Foreign Policy Challenges", paper presented at the 13th Annual Enriching the Middle East's Economic Future Conference, The UCLA Center for Middle East Development, October 30–31, 2018 Doha, Qatar (Invited speaker)
 "Activities of PKK and FETO in the West: Networking, recruitment, funding and institutionalization", paper presented at the Trt World Forum on Envisioning Peace and Security in a Fragmented World, 3–4 October 2018, Istanbul, Turkey (Invited speaker)
 "Interactions between Diaspora Associations and Government Agencies: Mechanisms and policies to respond current and up-coming challenges", paper presented at the Regional Conference on “Platform for co-operation policies: role of diaspora associations and synergies with public authorities” organised by the Parliamentary Network on Diaspora Policies of the Parliamentary Assembly of the Council of Europe, Verkhovna Rada of Ukraine 24 September 2018,  Kyiv, Ukraine.(Invited speaker)
 "Countering Terrorism in the Post-Daesh Era in the Middle East"  paper presented at the Annual Oxford Gulf & Arabian Peninsula Studies Forum on Trends and Transformation in the Middle East, St Anthony's College, Oxford University, 12 May 2018, Oxford, UK (Invited speaker)
 "Jeo-political Significance of The New Silk Road Project for the Participating Countries" paper presented at "The role of Parliamentarians in boosting economic cooperation and cultural ties along the Silk Road Conference", organized by The Silk Road Support Group of the OSCE PA, 13–14 March 2018, Baku, Azerbaijan, (Invited speaker)
 “Objectives of Turkey’s Cross-Border Operations: Security, Stability and Territorial Integrity of Syria” paper presented at the panel on "Turkey’s Security Challenge within its Neighbourhood: Operation Olive Branch”, organized by the Conference on Security Associations  and TRT World Research Center, 28 February 2018, Ottawa, Canada. (Invited Speaker)
 "Changing Security Environment in Syria and Turkey’s Response" paper presented at the panel on Turkey’s Operation Olive Branch and Security Challenges Beyond", organized by the Royal Canadian Military Institute (RCMI) and NATO Association of Canada (NAOC), TRT World Research Center, 27 February 2018, Toronto, Canada. (Invited Speaker)
 "Turkey's Response to Migration Crisis: Syrian Refugees and Turkey-EU Migration Deal" paper presented at the panel on Social, Political and Economic Impact of Migration at the Enriching the Middle East’s Economic Future Conference, organized by  UCLA Center for Middle East Development & Foreign Ministry of Qatar, 11–14 November 2017, Doha, Qatar. (Invited Speaker)
  "Trajectory of Turkey-EU Relations: Obstacles and Opportunities" paper presented at the panel on Turkey’s Foreign Policy: New Directions and Challenges at the TRT World Forum, 18 October 2017, Istanbul, Turkey. (Invited Speaker)
 “Tansnational Networks, Diasporic Communities and Revisiting Political Participation" paper presented at the Conference of the Parliamentary Network on Diaspora Policy, Organized by the Parliamentary Assembly of Council of Europe (PACE), 7–8 September 2017, Lisbon, Portugal. (Invited Speaker)
 “Impact of Belt and Road Initiative on Political and Economic Cooperation in the Middle East" paper presented at the 3rd Silk Road Tianshan Forum organized by Central Asia Region Development Center, 11–12 July 2017, Urumqi, China. (Invited Speaker)
 “15 July Coup Attempt and Turkey-EU Relations in the New Era” paper presented at a panel organized by DS Centre for Policy Studies and Democracy for All, The House of Parliament, 7 December 2016, London, UK. (Invited Speaker)
 “Refugee Crisis in Europe and the Role of Turkey” paper presented at a panel organized by Union of Turkish Democrats (UETD-UK), The House of Parliament, 16 November 2016, London, UK. (Invited Speaker)
 “Political Developments, 15 July Coup Attempt and FETÖ in Turkey” paper presented at a seminar organized by the Center for Middle East Studies, Beijing University, 2 November 2016, Beijing, China. (Invited Speaker)
 “Turkish Foreign Policy and Turkish-Chinese Relations” paper presented at a roundtable meeting organized by Chonyang Finance Research Institute, Remnin University, 2 November 2016, Beijing, China. (Invited Speaker)
 “Turkish Politics and its Global Implications” paper presented at a seminar organized by Center for Turkish Studies, University of Shanghai University, 31 October 2016, Shanghai, China. (Invited Speaker)
 “Continuities and Adjustments in Turkish Foreign Policy” paper presented at a seminar organized by Department of Public Policy and International Relations, Shanghai University of International Studies, 31 October 2016, Shanghai, China. (Invited Speaker)
 “Political Responses to July 15th Coup Attempt in Turkey” paper presented at the International Conference on the Failed Coup and the Future of Civil Society in Turkey, organized by Marmara University, IGETEV and Nun Foundation, 27–28 October 2016, İstanbul, Turkey. (Invited Speaker)
 “Trajectory of Turkish-US Relations and Current Challenges”, paper presented at the Outlook for Turkey-US Relations Roundtable Meeting, organized by GMF, 5 May 2016, Ankara, Turkey. (Invited Speaker)
 “Challenges to Muslim World: Social and Political Sources of Extremism” paper presented at the Conference on Rethinking Violent Extremism in the MENA Region, organized by The Afro-Middle East Centre together with Al Sharq Forum, 9– 10 April 2016, İstanbul, Turkey. (Invited Speaker)
 “Islam, Turkey and the Future of Europe” paper presented at a roundtable meeting organized by the Centre on Religion and Geopolitics of the Tony Blair Faith Foundation and the British Institute of Turkish Affairs (BITAF),11 March 2016, London, UK. (Invited Speaker)
 “Turkey, the EU, and Migration” paper presented at a panel organized by the Centre on Religion and Geopolitics of the Tony Blair Faith Foundation and the British Institute of Turkish Affairs (BITAF), The House of Parliament, 10 March 2016, London, UK. (Invited Speaker)
 "How AKP interprets and manages the idea of secularism in Turkey today?" paper presented at a roundtable meeting organized by International Policy Leadership Institution (IPLI Foundation), 3 March 2016, Paris, France. (Invited Speaker)
 “Findings on Discrimination and Intolerance Against Muslims in the OSCE Area”, Paper presented at the OSCE Permanent Council Meeting, 11 December 2014, Vienna. (Invited Speaker)
 “Cultural and Religion Diversity in Modern Turkey”, paper presented at the Leaders for Interreligious Understanding Seminar on Managing Religious Diversity and Cross-cultural Dialogue, Organized by Adyan Foundation, 14–18 November 2014, İstanbul, Turkey. (Invited Speaker)
 “Challenging Islamophobia and Foundations of Religious Tolerance”, paper presented at the International Conference on Promoting Religious Tolerance. Organized by OSCE and UNESCO, 17–18 November 2014, Baku, Azerbaijan, (Invited Speaker)
 “Islamophobia: An Ideology in the Making”, paper presented at the Workshop on Islamophobia: Fact or Fiction?, organized by EMISCO and Thinkout, 30 September 2014, Warsaw, Poland. (Invited Speaker)
 “Mapping Challenges Concerning Muslims in the OSCE Region”, paper presented at the Human Dimension Implementation Meeting 2014, OSCE, 22 September – 3 October 2014, Warsaw, Poland. (Invited Speaker)
 "Hearing on Anti-Semitism, Racism and Discrimination in the OSCE Region", (Testified in the U.S. Congress to the Commission on Security and Cooperation in Europe), Dirksen Senate Office Building, 22 July 2014, Washington DC, USA. (Invited Speaker)
 “Religious Freedom in Turkey”, paper presented at the Conference on Religions and Constitutional Transitions in the Muslim Mediterranean: “The Pluralistic Moment”, Co-organised by Insubria Center on Law and Religion in the Mediterranean Region, Insubria University,  and the International Center for Law and Religion Studies, Brigham Young University, June 3–5, 2014, Como, Italy. (Invited Speaker)
 ”Emergence of a New Turkey: Social and Political Transformations under the AK Party”, paper presented at the international meeting on Building Dialogue Channels between Armenian and Turkish Societies, Organized by Tesev and Olive Tree Initiative, University of California, LA, 2014 May 16–18. (Invited Speaker)
 “Governing Religions in Europe: Turkish Muslims as Citizens”, Paper presented at the Muslim Minorities in the West Symposium, Department of Sociology, Fatih University, 21 April 2014, Istanbul, Turkey
 “Turkey and Eastern Mediterranean Energy Prospects”, paper presented at The Eastern Mediterranean Energy Workshop, Middle East Regional Security and Cooperation Meeting, 13–15 February 2014, Prague, Czech Republic (Invited Speaker)
  “Impact of Domestic Actors on Foreign Policy in Turkey”, paper presented at the international workshop on Turkish-Israeli Cooperation in a Changing Middle East, organized by TESEV, Friedrich Ebert Stiftung and The Van Leer Jerusalem Institute, 22 December 2013, Jerusalem, Israel (Invited Speaker)
  “Religion as Identity Marker and Managing Islam in Europe”, paper presented at the 1st Turkish-German Frontiers of Humanities Symposium, Alexander von Humboldt-Stiftung, Stiftung Mercator and the Koç University, 27–30 November 2013, İstanbul, (Invited Speaker)
 “Turkish Priorities in the Middle East and Regional Challenges” paper presented at the international workshop on A Changing Middle East: Turkish-Israeli Perspectives organized by TESEV, Friedrich Ebert Stiftung and The Van Leer Jerusalem Institute, 2 October 2013, Istanbul, Turkey, (Invited Speaker)
 “Social and Political Transformations and New Challenges in Turkey” paper presented at the Conference on "Challenges of the Erdoğan Administration for Regional Stabilization", Sasakawa Peace Foundation Middle East Program, 25 September 2013, Tokyo, Japan, (Invited Speaker)
 “Secularism and Freedom of Religion in the Turkish Constitution”, International Workshop on Promoting Religious Freedom and Peaceful Coexistence, ISPI (Istituto per gli Studi di Politica Internazionale) the Italian Ministry of Foreign Affairs, 11 February 2013, Rome, Italy. (Invited Speaker)
 “Transformation of Islamic Movements and Sectarian Politics in the Middle East”, Paper presented at The NATO Roundtable Meeting on the Middle East, NATO Headquarters, 18 December 2012, Brussels, Belgium. (Invited Speaker)
 ‘Secularism and State-Relations in Turkey’, paper presented at the Conference on Search for a New Social Contract in the Middle East: Tunis-Turkey, Seta Foundation & Ru’ye Turkiyye, 20–21 October 2012, Tunis
 “Social and Political Dynamism in Turkey”, paper presented at the 2nd Turkish-British Tatlidil Conference, Session 3: Turkey and the UK – Societies in Dynamic Change, 12–14 October 2012, Istanbul (Invited Speaker)
 “Turkey’s Vision and Understanding of Alliance of Civilization”, paper presented at the International Symposium on Turkish-Russian Relations in the 21st Century, From Cold War Rivalry to Strategic Partnership, St. Petersburg State University & Russian-Turkish Cultural Center, 5 October 2012, St Petersburg, (Invited Speaker) 
 “The Neighborhood and a Global Turkey”, paper presented at the Interpreting the New Turkey Conference, OCP Foundation & GMF Transatlantic Center, February 16, 2012, Brussels, (Invited Speaker) 
 “The Role of Turkey in the Middle East”, Insight Turkey Second Annual Conference on Middle East After the Revolution: Perspectives from Egypt and Turkey, Seta Foundation, 30 January 2012, Cairo.
  “Reflections on State-Religion Relations Models”, paper presented at Workshop on the State-Religion Relations in Kyrgyzstan and Turkey, organized Marmara University Faculty of Theology and Farabi University, 27–29 December 2011, Istanbul. (Invited Speaker)
  “Changing Arab Perceptions in Turkey”, paper presented at The First Turkish-Arab Media Forum, Organized by General Directorate of Press and Information, 29 November–3 December 2011, Conrad Hotel, Istanbul. (Invited Speaker)
  “The European Union and the Muslim World: Challenges and Opportunities”, paper presented at the Strategic Vision Development Meeting, organized by Higher Security Academy of Sudan and Tasam, 26 November 2011 – 3 December 2011, Istanbul, Invited Speaker)
  “Cultural and Religious Diversity in the Context of Turkish-EU Relations”, paper presented at The Soul in Europe: East meets West - Social and Religious Identity in an Expanding Europe Conference, 16–21 October 2011, istanbul (Invited Speaker)
  “Arab Spring and the Turkish Experience: Lessons to be Learned”, paper presented at the international panel on Youth and Change in the Arab World, organized by Al Jazeera Centre for Studies, 27–28 May, Doha, Qatar. (Invited Speaker)
 ‘Religion and State in Comparative Perspective”, paper presented at the European Society for Intercultural Theology and Interreligious Studies Programme on The Study of Religions in a Changing Europe: Integrity, Translation and Transformation, 9 May 2011, Istanbul. (Invited Speaker)
  “Managing Religion and Religious Diversity in Turkey: Reforms and Questions”,  paper presented at the “World Partner Forum-Building Bridges”, organized by Daimler Financial Services of Turkey, 6 May 2011, Istanbul. 
  “Politics of Religion, Secularism and Democratization in Turkey: The Past and the Present”, Paper Presented at The Sasakawa Middle East Islam Fund of the Sasakawa Peace Foundation, 17 February 2011, Tokyo, Japan. (Invited Speaker)
  “Turkish Perceptions of Arabs”, paper presented at the First Turkish-Saudi Forum, Organized by the Institute of Diplomatic Studies & Strategic Research Centre, 11–12 January 2011, Riyadh, Saudi Arabia. (Invited Speaker)
  “Regional and Global Cooperation to Stabilize Iraq”, paper presented at the International Congress on The Middle East, ‘Iraq’, Organized by Tasam, 10–12 November 2010, Hatay, Turkey
 ‘Islam and the Secular State in the Turkish Experience”, paper presented at the International Conference on Arab Societies and the Turkish Model, The Middle East Studies Center and Al Sharq Center for Regional and Strategic Studies, October 2, 2010, Cairo, Egypt
 “Past and Present Image of Arabs in Turkey”, paper presented at the Turkish-Arab Forum, Organized by SETA Foundation, 14 June 2010, Istanbul.
  “Cultural Dimension in Turkish-EU Relations”, Keynote speech at The European Public Policy Conference (EPPC), Koc University, 22–23 April, Istanbul.
 “Secularism, Law and Religion: Towards New Directions in Turkey”, paper presented at the International Workshop on Law and Religion in Mediterranean Islam, Como, Italy, 6–8 April 2010.
  “Transformation of Centre-Periphery Relations in Turkey: Politics, Islam and Secularism”, paper presented at the International Conference on "Secularism in the Arab Levant 2 - Secular State and the Question of Religion", 12–13 February 2010, Damascus, Syria.
  “Dynamics of State-Religion Relations in Modern Turkey”, paper presented at the  Religion & Society Congress, VU University Amsterdam, The Netherlands, 20–22 October 2009.
  “Role of Higher Education Institutions on relations between Turkey-Azerbaijan”, International workshop on Turkey-Azerbaijani Relations, Seta Foundation, Ceylan Intercontinental Hotel, Istanbul 25-27 Haziran 2009.
 “Secular Nationalism and Incorporation of Religion by the State: Foundations of Civil Religion in Turkey”, International conference on “Civil Religion in the United States and Europe: Four Comparative Perspectives”, Brigham Young University, Provo, Utah, USA, March 12–14, 2009.
 “Religion and Law in Turkey: Political Consequences”, Emerging Legal Issues Involving Islam in Europe, Part II", Central European University, Budapest, Hungary, 13–14 June 2008.
  “Bringing Two Identities and Cultures Closer: Turkish Social Capital in Europe”, Paper presented at the international conference on “Migration and Women”, Istanbul, Turkey, 1–2 December 2007.
 “Turkish Migrants, Social Capital and Culturalist Discourse in Turkey-EU Relations”, Paper presented at the International Conference on Turkey in Europe: Religion, Politics and the Politics of Religion, Organized by the University of Copenhagen & Danish Institute for International Studies, Copenhagen, Denmark, 18–20 January 2007.
 “Models of State-Religion Relations: The Case of Turkey,” The Thirteenth Annual International Law and Religion Symposium on the 1981 U.N. Declaration on Religious Tolerance and Non-Discrimination: Implementing Its Principles after Twenty-five Years, International Center for Law and Religion Studies, Brigham Young University and the International Academy for Freedom of Religion and Belief,  Provo, Utah, October 1–4, 2006
  “Managing Religious Diversity in Turkey: The Past and the Present,” Religious Freedom and World Peace, Brigham Young University and the Columbia University, The United Nations Building,  New York City, New York, 5–6 October 2006
  “Modernization, Secularization and Religion in Europe and Turkey”, Transatlantic Dialogue on Religion and Politics: Concepts, Definitions, and Trends, The American Institute for Contemporary German Studies, The Brookings Institution Washington, D.C., 7 July 2006.
  “Challenges to Political Leadership in Combating Islamophobia”, Paper presented at The Second Roundtable Meeting on Representation of Muslims in Public Discourse, organized by The OSCE Office for Democratic Institutions and Human Rights, Warsaw, Poland, 9 May 2006.

Editorial Board Memberships
 European Journal of Economic and Political Studies (EJEPS)
 Perceptions, Journal of International Affairs
 Turkish Journal of Politics
 Journal of Academic Studies
 Turkish Journal of Islamic Studies
 Journal of Higher Education and Science
 İletişim ve Diplomasi
 Insight Turkey
 Akademik Ortadogu
 Ortadoğu Analiz

See also
25th Parliament of Turkey

References

External links
 https://www.akparti.org.tr/site/yonetim/milletvekilleri/25
 https://marmara.academia.edu/TalipKucukcan
 Collection of all relevant news items at Haberler.com
 SETA page
 Collection of all relevant news items at Son Dakika

Justice and Development Party (Turkey) politicians
Deputies of Adana
Members of the 25th Parliament of Turkey
Living people
People from Osmaniye
1963 births
Members of the 26th Parliament of Turkey
Members of the Parliamentary Assembly of the Council of Europe